is a Japanese singer and dōjin music composer known for her vocal themes in the Atelier Iris and Ar tonelico series. She also wrote the lyrics and sang the ending themes to the first two seasons of Rozen Maiden as well as the OVA under the name Kukui, with Myu. Shimotsuki's original music mainly consists of ethnic and fantasy music, and most of her songs are soft in tone.

Career 
Haruka Shimotsuki started her career in 2001 beginning with singing main themes for games, and writing and composing songs. She started releasing her dōjin music under the names Maple Leaf and tieLeaf; tieLeaf is a collaborative circle with Ao Sorano and Nao Hiyama. The group has a seventy-two-page dōjinshi, one CD entitled Tsukioi no Toshi (also called Leozet Lag Ecliss in its own original language, the Lag-Quara language), a manga and novel text story book that was twenty-eight pages, and a single CD with the same name as the book, Lip-Aura, a side-story of Tsukioi no Toshi. Another project by tieLeaf, an adventure titled Neji Maku Tsuki, serves as a tie-in to Tsukioi no Toshi.

She gained attention after singing the ending theme "Tōmei Shelter" for Rozen Maiden under the name Refio+Shimotsuki Haruka. After singing "Tōmei Shelter", she and Myu (a member of Refio) formed the band Kukui. Shimotsuki has also formed a group with Rekka Katakiri and Chata many times, and they have been good friends for a long time. As an independent singer, she was once a supporting member of Sound Horizon, and made an appearance as a guest singer in their 2006 concert. She took a more major role in Sound Horizon's album Moira and performed in the corresponding live concerts in 2008 and 2009. Haruka Shimotsuki held a solo concert, : Haruka Shimotsuki Solo Live Lv.1 on August 10, 2006. Her second solo concert, Haruka Shimotsuki solo live Lv.2: , was held on July 13, 2008.

Besides singing, composing and writing the lyrics for the opening and ending themes for the PC visual novel Relict: Toki no Wasuremono, she also composed about seven background music tracks for the game. Wind and string instruments are heavily used for the tracks, and she was able to exhibit her talent in ethnic music. This was her first time in composing songs for a game, and her feelings at that time were recorded in the booklet attached to the Image Soundtrack of the game. In the PlayStation 2 game Ar tonelico: Melody of Elemia, she composed and performed the songs of one of the heroines, Aurica Nestmille, and took part in singing the ending theme "EXEC_PHANTASMAGORIA/.". She later took part in the sequel Ar tonelico II Sekai ni Hibiku Shōjo-tachi no Metafalica as the singing voice of one of the heroines, Luca Truelywaath, and took part in the ending song "EXEC_with.METHOD_METAFALICA/.".

In November 2009, she had another concert, Haruka Shimotsuki Original Fantasy Concert 2009 -FEL ARY ARIA-, was held at NIPPON SEINEN-KAN HALL featuring all her songs from Tindharia no Tane and a select few from Griotte no Nemurihime. It was later released on DVD on February 24, 2010.

Discography

Dōjin albums 
 Ciel Etoile (BGM arrange album for Key's Air) (October 2001)
 Sacred Doors Vol.1 (October 2001)
 Reed+ (BGM arrange album for the MMORPG Ragnarok Online) (October 2002)
  (December 30, 2002)
 Impronta/ (October 19, 2003)
  (Under the name tieLeaf) (December 30, 2005)
 Maple Leaf Box (December 29, 2006)
 Lip Aura (Tsukioi no Toshi side-story) (August 17, 2007)
 : Sacred Doors Another Tale (August 16, 2008)
  (August 15, 2010)
  - with arcane753 circle composed of Manyo (composition/arrangement), Nao Hiyama (lyrics) and Shimotsuki (vocals) (December 29, 2010)
  - with arcane753 circle (with Marie as guest vocalist) (August 13, 2011)
  - with arcane753 circle (with Marie as guest vocalist) (August 11, 2012)

Commercial singles 
  (PS2 version Princess Maker 4 theme song; released October 26, 2005)
  (Collaboration single with Revo of Sound Horizon; released June 14, 2006)
  (Released September 26, 2007)
  (TV anime H2O: Footprints in the Sand ending theme and insert song; released February 22, 2008)
 "break time" (Web radio program Frost Moon Cafe opening and ending theme; released April 8, 2009)
  (PSP game Dice Dice Fantasia theme song; released December 23, 2009)
  (PS3 game Last Rebellion ending song; released February 10, 2010)
 "smile link" (Frost Moon Cafe+ opening and ending theme; released June 1, 2011)

Commercial albums 
  (Released September 22, 2005) (Compilation album)
  (Released February 28, 2007)
  (Released June 25, 2008) (Compilation album)
  (Released October 14, 2009) (an album in the Tindharia universe)
  (Released April 14, 2010)  (Compilation album)
 Innocent Grey Haruka Shimotsuki Collection (Released January 14, 2011)
  (Released February 23, 2011)
  (Released April 25, 2012) (an album in the Tindharia universe)
  (Released June 30, 2012) (an album in the Tindharia universe)
  (Released November 14, 2012)

Other works

Anime 
  (September 27, 2006)
 Nishi no yoki Majo (opening)

Games 
 Akai Ito Original Soundtrack (November 3, 2004)
 : Progressive Memories (December 1, 2004)
 Taito no Suika (Music video game Beatmania IIDX 10 th Style CS) (2004) 
  (April 20, 2005)
 Atelier Iris ~Eternal Mana 2~ Original Soundtrack (May 18, 2005)
 : Manie (August 19, 2005)
 Atelier Iris ~Eternal Mana 2~ Original Drama Vol. 2 (October 5, 2005)
 Ar tonelico Hymmnos concert side Crimson Tsuki Kanade: Tsuki Kanade (January 25, 2006)
  (Under the name MW, a duet with Rekka Katakiri; released January 27, 2006)
  (March 21, 2006)
  (June 21, 2006)
 : Ar tonelico Hymmnos Musical (August 30, 2006)
 : Ar tonelico Hymmnos Musical (February 28, 2007)
  (May 5, 2007)
  (May 30, 2007)
  (October 10, 2007)
  (October 24, 2007)
 Clear
 : Visitor of Another Air
 
  Full Voice Edition
  (April 20, 2008)
  (July 4, 2008)
  (August 15, 2008)
  (January 27, 2010)
  (November 10, 2010)
  (December 22, 2010)
  (February 23, 2010)
 -HISTORIA- (Radiant Historia ending theme.) with composer Yoko Shimomura (November 3, 2010)
  (March 14, 2012) 
 , Track 3 (September 5, 2012)
 Element of SPADA (Music video game Beatmania IIDX 21 SPADA) (2013)
 Kurobeni Sukui (Music video game ) (2016)
 FestivaLight (Music video game maimai MiLK PLUS) (2018)
 Monster Boy and the Cursed Kingdom (2018)
 Cross Edge (2008)
 Trinity Universe (2009)
 Étoile (Japanese ver.) (Mobile game MementoMori) (2022)

Dōjin

Drama CDs 
  (May 28, 2008)
  (August 15, 2010) - with Annabel
  (August 15, 2010)

Cover songs 
"Englishman in New York" (on the album SoulS)

With Barbarian on the Groove 
Taos Pueblo (album)
Le Monde Musical De (album)
Dragon Valley
Dragon Valley ~Arco Iris~
Dragon Valley ~Twilight~

References

External links 
  
  
 Web Radio Harechatta Utatane Biyori 

Anime musicians
Doujin music
Japanese composers
Japanese women composers
Japanese women singers
Living people
Musicians from Miyagi Prefecture
Video game musicians
Year of birth missing (living people)